Genlisea hispidula is a corkscrew plant native to Africa.

References 

hispidula